The Obuchi Cabinet governed Japan from July 1998 to April 2000 under the leadership of Prime Minister Keizō Obuchi, who took office after winning the Liberal Democratic Party leadership. Initially a continued LDP single-party government without legislative majority in parliament on its own after the 1998 election, it expanded to become a coalition involving first the Liberal Party and then the New Komeito over the course of its term. The government focused on economic revival, with former Prime Minister Kiichi Miyazawa recalled to the position of Finance Minister, and introduced policies designed to stimulate the economy through tax cuts and public spending increases.

Obuchi reshuffled his cabinet twice, firstly in January 1999 after having negotiated a coalition agreement with the Liberal Party. This did not bring about any major change in personnel other than to bring Liberal Takeshi Noda into government as Home Minister, and reduce the number of ministers by doubling up portfolios. The second reshuffle in October 1999 was a more substantial reconstruction, and took place following Obuchi's re-election as LDP president. At the same time, the coalition expanded again to include the New Komeito, beginning the long-running LDP-NKP partnership. The coalition continued until April 2000 when Liberal Leader Ichirō Ozawa decided to withdraw from the arrangement, causing a section of the Liberal Party to break away and form the New Conservative Party, which remained in the government.

The Obuchi cabinet ended in early April 2000 when Obuchi fell into a coma after suffering a serious, and ultimately fatal stroke. With the Prime Minister unable to discharge his duties, Chief Cabinet Secretary Mikio Aoki served as Acting Prime Minister for several days, until the cabinet determined to resign and Yoshirō Mori was chosen to replace Obuchi.

Election of the Prime Minister 
Obuchi's election demonstrated how the Diet was divided following the 1998 upper house election. In the House of Representatives, Obuchi was elected on the first ballot, however the first ballot in the House of Councillors did not produce a majority for any candidate. In the subsequent runoff vote, opposition leader Naoto Kan won with the support of all opposition parties allied against the LDP. This did not affect Obuchi's appointment as Prime Minister, as the constitution stipulates that in such a scenario, the will of the lower house prevails.

Ministers 

R = Member of the House of Representatives
C = Member of the House of Councillors

Cabinet

Changes 
 October 23 - Hakuo Yanagisawa the Director of the National Land Agency was moved to become the Minister of State for Financial Reconstruction (which later became the Chairman of the Financial Reconstruction Commission) and was replaced with Yoshio Inoue, who doubled up as Hokkaido and Okinawa development minister.
 November 21 - Fukushiro Nukaga resigned as Defence Minister due to a corruption scandal, he was replaced with Hosei Norota.

First Reshuffled Cabinet

Changes 
 March 8, 1999 - Minister of Justice Shozaburo Nakamura resigned over a controversy relating to actor Arnold Schwarzenegger being allowed to enter Japan without a passport, and was replaced by Takao Jinnouchi.

Second Reshuffled Cabinet

Changes 
 February 25, 2000 - Chairman of the Financial Reconstruction Commission Michio Ochi resigned following controversial comments he made related to regulation and inspection of banks. He was replaced by Sadakazu Tanigaki.
 April 1, 2000 - Coalition negotiations between the Liberal Party and the LDP broke down leading to the party pulling out of the coalition. This caused a split, with some Liberals wishing to remain in government. 
 April 2, 2000 - Prime Minister Obuchi suffered a debilitating stroke and fell into a coma. Chief Cabinet Secretary Mikio Aoki assumed his duties as Acting Prime Minister until April 5 when LDP Secretary-general Yoshiro Mori was appointed as replacement Prime Minister. Obuchi died on May 14.
 April 3, 2000 - The dissident Liberals launched the New Conservative Party under the leadership of Chikage Oogi, and remained in government under that banner, including Transport Minister Toshihiro Nikai.

References

External links 
Lists of Ministers at the Kantei: 
 Obuchi Cabinet 
 (First reshuffle) 
 (Second reshuffle) 

Cabinet of Japan
1998 establishments in Japan
2000 disestablishments in Japan
Cabinets established in 1998
Cabinets disestablished in 2000